Iura may refer to:

Ius, plural iura, right or law in Latin
Arata Iura (born 1974), Japanese actor

See also 
Lura (disambiguation)
Jura (disambiguation)
Yura (disambiguation)